Lucille Wallenrod, also known as Lucille Wallenrod-Dreyblatt, (1918 – 1998) was an American artist. She was active in Long Island, New York from 1939 until  the 1990s.

Early life and education
Lucille Wallenrod was born on October 4, 1920 in Brooklyn, New York, and grew up in Freeport, Long Island, New York. Wallenrod was born with cerebral palsy.

She studied at the W.P.A. Art Class (1939), Nassau Art League (1940), the American Artists School (1942), and at the Art Students League of New York (1943). She had studied with painter Sol Wilson at Art Students League of New York.

Career 
Because Wallenrod had cerebral palsy, and she painted with a special arm brace of her own design. She painted dramatic expressionist seascapes, with broad strokes and deep vivid colors, and still lifes and portraits as well. Wallenrod had her first solo exhibition at the Roko Gallery (1946) and then belonged for many years to the Charles Barzansky Gallery, both in New York City.  She also participated in numerous group exhibitions in the late forties until the early nineteen sixties.

She won a number of competitions, most notably the first prize in the National Art Contest sponsored by the then President Eisenhower's Committee on the Handicapped in 1956. Judges for this competition were Isabel Bishop and Andrew Wyeth.  Her work was often reviewed in New York and Long Island newspapers.

Death 
Due to a long terminal illness, Lucille Wallenrod's output waned in her later years, yet her interest and sensitivity for the arts never faltered. She died in Ridge, New York in 1998. Her husband, Gerald Dreyblatt, died in Florida in 2008. She is survived by her son, Arnold Dreyblatt.

Gallery

References

 "The Monthly Supplement", 1952, International Who's Who, Inc.
 Vertical file on Lucille Wallenrod, Smithsonian Libraries Collections, Art and Artists Files
 Artist File, The Newark Museum Library Collection
 Lucille Dreyblatt profile at ArtFact.com

20th-century American painters
American women painters
Art Students League of New York alumni
Modern painters
1918 births
1998 deaths
20th-century American women artists
People from Freeport, New York